Clarence Edward "Babe" Twombly (January 18, 1896 in Jamaica Plain, Massachusetts – November 23, 1974 in San Clemente, California), was a former professional baseball player who was an outfielder in the Major Leagues from 1920 to 1921.  He would play for the Chicago Cubs.

Babe was the younger brother of George Twombly who played Major League Baseball as well.  

Despite just 358 at bats at the Major League level with the Cubs, Babe had a career batting average of .304 and hit three big league home runs.

References

External links

1896 births
1974 deaths
Baseball players from Massachusetts
Major League Baseball outfielders
Chicago Cubs players
People from San Clemente, California
Lehigh Mountain Hawks baseball players
Los Angeles Angels (minor league) players
Jersey City Skeeters players
Seattle Indians players
Hollywood Stars players
People from Jamaica Plain